Alejandro Baratta (born 13 April 1959) is an Argentine cross-country skier. He competed in the men's 30 kilometre event at the 1984 Winter Olympics.

References

1959 births
Living people
Argentine male cross-country skiers
Olympic cross-country skiers of Argentina
Cross-country skiers at the 1984 Winter Olympics
Sportspeople from Bariloche